Yao Weili (born 6 May 1968) is a retired Chinese long jumper.

Her personal best jump was 7.01 metres, achieved in June 1993 in Jinan.

International competitions

References

1968 births
Living people
Chinese female long jumpers
Athletes (track and field) at the 1994 Asian Games
Asian Games medalists in athletics (track and field)
World Athletics Championships athletes for China
Asian Games gold medalists for China
Medalists at the 1994 Asian Games
20th-century Chinese women